The Savage Nation: Saving America from the Liberal Assault on Our Borders, Language, and Culture is Michael Savage's 18th book. It was published in 2003 and spent 18 weeks on the NY Times best seller list, debuting at #4.  It provides conservative social commentary and criticism of liberals,  and Democrats.

References 

Political books
2003 non-fiction books
Books critical of modern liberalism in the United States
American nationalism